Hylandra suecica is a species of cruciferous plants. Its origin is Swedish. It was originally described by Elias Magnus Fries in 1846 as a subspecies of "Arabis thaliana" (now Arabidopsis thaliana) and later moved to its own genus by Áskell Löve in 1961.

References

Brassicaceae
Flora of Sweden
Monotypic Brassicaceae genera